If You Can't Lick 'Em... Lick 'Em is the tenth studio album by American hard rock guitarist Ted Nugent. The album was released in February 1988, by Atlantic Records and reached No. 112 in the Billboard 200 US chart. It also marks the first album to feature Nugent as the sole lead vocalist after only providing secondary lead vocals on previous albums.

Promotional music videos were released for "She Drives Me Crazy" and "That's the Story of Love".

Track listing
All songs written and arranged by Ted Nugent, except "That's the Story of Love", written by Jon Bon Jovi, Richie Sambora and Ted Nugent.

Personnel

Musicians
 Ted Nugent – lead and backing vocals, lead guitar, bass, producer
 Dave Amato – rhythm guitar, backing vocals
 Jai Winding – Hammond B3 organ 
 John Purdell – keyboards, producer on tracks 2, 3, 8-10
 Chuck Wright – bass
 Pat Torpey – drums, backing vocals
 Tom Werman – percussion, producer on tracks 1, 4-7, executive producer

Production
 Duane Baron – producer on tracks 2, 3, 8-10, engineer
 Richard McKernan – engineer
 Bryan Arnett, Gary Wagner – assistant engineers
 Bobby Warner – mastering
 Bob Defrin – art direction
 Peter Tsakiris – art direction, design
 Ross Marino – photography
 Roy Volkman – cover photo, photography
 Eric Conn – digital remastering

References

1988 albums
Ted Nugent albums
Albums produced by Tom Werman
Atlantic Records albums